Schröcken is a municipality in the district of Bregenz, in the westernmost Austrian state of Vorarlberg.

Geography
Schröcken is in the Austrian Alps, at an altitude of 1,269 meters. 12.4% of the area are forested, 39.4% Alpine area.

History
The region around Schröcken was first populated around 1300 CE by German-speaking people known as the Walser, who came to Austria in from the Bernese Oberland (highlands) located in the southern part of the Canton of Bern, Switzerland. The town became part of a regional administrative area called Tannberg in 1806.  From 1805 to 1814, the town was under the jurisdiction of the Free State of Bavaria.  Later it reverted to become part of the Austro-Hungarian Habsburg Empire, and in 1861 was integrated into the newly founded state of Vorarlberg, Austria. 
From 1945 to 1955, Schröcken was part of the French occupation zone in Austria.

Name
The original name was "Girsboden".  "Schröcken" first appeared in the early 17th century.

Population

Politics
The political administration body consists of a 9-member council and a mayor.

Sights
Church of Our Lady of the Assumption
The first church of Schröcken was built in 1639. The church increased its membership from 1726 to 1732, but the building was destroyed by fire in 1863.  A rebuilding effort took place between 1864 and 1867, when it was re-consecrated.  The church is surrounded by a walled cemetery.

Chapel of the Annunciation 
18th century neo-Gothic chapel, consecrated in 1779.

Economy
Tourism is the main economic enterprise, with an emphasis on outdoor activities including, skiing, hiking, and other mountain sports.

Transportation
There is public transportation provided by Wälderbus 40 or 42, which connects with the broader Vorarlberg-Austrian-European network. The main road is the Bregenzerwald Bundesstraße 200.

Education
The town has  a primary school and a kindergarten.

Climate

See also
 Horizon Field

References

 Schröcken

External links
 Google Map of Walser Settlements 1200 to Present

Cities and towns in Bregenz District